ICDL may refer to:
Interdisciplinary Council on Developmental and Learning Disorders
International Computer Driving License or European Computer Driving Licence
International Children's Digital Library